The 2019 FIFA U-20 World Cup was the 22nd edition of the FIFA U-20 World Cup, the biennial international men's youth football championship contested by the under-20 national teams of the member associations of FIFA, since its inception in 1977 as the FIFA World Youth Championship. The tournament was hosted by Poland between 23 May and 15 June 2019. This was the first FIFA tournament hosted by Poland; the country had hosted UEFA international football events in the past including the UEFA Euro 2012 with Ukraine and the 2017 UEFA European Under-21 Championship.

England won the previous tournament in South Korea, but did not qualify for the tournament after finishing sixth at the 2018 UEFA European Under-19 Championship in Finland. In doing so, they became the sixth consecutive incumbent title holders to fail to qualify for the subsequent tournament. The official match ball used in the tournament was Adidas Conext19.

Ukraine won their first FIFA U-20 World Cup title after beating South Korea 3–1 in the final. They did it in their first appearance further than the round of 16, becoming the first team from a former Soviet republic other than Russia to win a FIFA competition title since its dissolution in 1991. The Soviet Union, whose record is now inherited by Russia, previously won the inaugural U-20 World Cup in 1977.

Host selection
The bidding process to host the 2019 FIFA U-20 World Cup and the 2019 FIFA U-17 World Cup was launched by FIFA in June 2017. A member association may bid for both tournaments, but they would be awarded to different hosts.

Candidate countries
Two countries submitted formal bids to host the tournament.

FIFA announced Poland as the hosts after the FIFA Council meeting on 16 March 2018 in Bogotá, Colombia. Poland won the bid over India in a 9–5 vote.

Qualified teams
A total of 24 teams qualified for the final tournament. In addition to Poland, who qualified automatically as hosts, 23 other teams qualified from six separate continental competitions. The slot allocation was approved by the FIFA Council on 10 June 2018. All 24 teams qualified had played in the tournament prior to this edition, making this the first U-20 World Cup in which none of the teams that earned a spot were making their debut.

Venues
Bielsko-Biała, Bydgoszcz, Gdynia, Łódź, Lublin and Tychy were the six cities hosting the competition. Lubin (not to confuse with Lublin) ended up withdrawn from the list due to hotel capacity troubles and was replaced by Bielsko-Biała.

Organization
The emblem was unveiled on 14 December 2018. The emblem features a crocus, a flower that blooms every spring in Poland combined with the colors of the Polish flag, symbolising the new faces that will emerge to shape the tournament's trophy.

Grzywek, the official mascot was unveiled on 23 February 2019 one day before the final draw. Grzywek is inspired by a Polish bison distinctive name comes from the Polish word for "mane" – the long and coarse hair that adorns the neck of this striking animal – and also symbolises the country's pride at hosting its first ever FIFA competition.

Draw and schedule
The match schedule was unveiled on 14 December 2018, the same day as the official emblem.

The final draw was held on 24 February 2019, 17:30 CET (UTC+1), at the Gdynia Sports Arena in Gdynia. The 24 teams were drawn into six groups of four teams. The hosts Poland were automatically seeded into Pot 1 and assigned to position A1, while the remaining teams were seeded into their respective pots based on their results in the last five FIFA U-20 World Cups (more recent tournaments weighted more heavily), with bonus points awarded to confederation champions. Teams from Pot 1 were drawn first, followed by Pot 2, Pot 3, and finally Pot 4, with each team (apart from Poland) also drawn to one of the positions within their group. No group could contain more than one team from each confederation.

Match officials
A total of 21 refereeing trios (a referee and two assistant referees), 6 support referees, and 20 video assistant referees were appointed for the tournament.

Squads

Players born on or after 1 January 1999 and on or before 31 December 2003 were eligible to compete in the tournament.

Each team had to name a preliminary squad of between 22 and 50 players. From the preliminary squad, the team had to name a final squad of 21 players (three of whom must be goalkeepers) by the FIFA deadline. Players in the final squad could be replaced by a player from the preliminary squad due to serious injury or illness up to 24 hours prior to kickoff of the team's first match.

Group stage
The top two teams of each group and the four best third-placed teams advanced to the round of 16.

All times are local, CEST (UTC+2).

Tiebreakers
The ranking of teams in the group stage is determined as follows:

 Points obtained in all group matches (three points for a win, one for a draw, none for a defeat);
 Goal difference in all group matches;
 Number of goals scored in all group matches;
 Points obtained in the matches played between the teams in question;
 Goal difference in the matches played between the teams in question;
 Number of goals scored in the matches played between the teams in question;
 Fair play points in all group matches (only one deduction could be applied to a player in a single match): 
 Drawing of lots.

Group A

Group B

Group C

Group D

Group E

Group F

Ranking of third-placed teams
The four best third-placed teams from the six groups advanced to the knockout stage along with the six group winners and six runners-up.

Knockout stage
In the knockout stage, if a match was level at the end of 90 minutes of normal playing time, extra time would be played (two periods of 15 minutes each), where each team was allowed to make a fourth substitution. If still tied after extra time, the match would be decided by a penalty shoot-out to determine the winner.

In the round of 16, the four third-placed teams would be matched with the winners of groups A, B, C, and D. The specific match-ups involving the third-placed teams depended on which four third-placed teams qualified for the round of 16:

Bracket

Round of 16

Quarter-finals

Semi-finals

Third place match

Final

Awards
The following awards were given at the conclusion of the tournament. They were all sponsored by Adidas, except for the FIFA Fair Play Award.

Goalscorers

Erling Haaland was the top scorer: all his nine goals were scored in the same game.

Sponsorship

Adidas
Coca-Cola
Hyundai–Kia

Visa

References

External links

FIFA Technical Report

 
2019
2019 in youth association football
2018–19 in Polish football
International association football competitions hosted by Poland
May 2019 sports events in Europe
June 2019 sports events in Europe